Friendship Collegiate Academy Public Charter School is a public high school in Washington, D.C. Established in 2000, the school serves students in grades 9-12 and is part of the Friendship Public Charter School network.

History
Friendship Collegiate Academy opened on September 5, 2000.

Campus
Collegiate Academy is located in the former Carter G. Woodson Junior High School, across Minnesota Avenue from the Minnesota Avenue Washington Metro station.

Curriculum
Collegiate Academy offers a comprehensive curriculum including honors and Advanced Placement courses. An Early College program allows students starting in the ninth grade the opportunity to take college courses and earn up to two years of college credit as they complete their diploma. A Career Academy program offers courses in three focus areas: Arts and Communications, Engineering and Technology, and Health and Human Services.

Extracurricular activities
Student groups and activities include art club, choir, community service club, debate club, drama club, Friendship News Network, the Leadership Criminal Justice Program, National Honor Society, robotics team, science club, student government association, world language club, and yearbook.

The Collegiate Academy teams, known as the Knights, compete in girls & boys basketball, baseball, cheer-leading, football, soccer, track and field, and volleyball.

References

External links
http://www.vppartners.org/portfolio/pdf/VPP_Friendship.pdf
Official Website
Friendship News Network

Charter schools in the District of Columbia
District of Columbia Public Schools
Educational institutions established in 2000
Public high schools in Washington, D.C.
2000 establishments in Washington, D.C.